Lebanon School District is an urban public school district in Lebanon, Lebanon County, Pennsylvania. One of the oldest school districts in the Commonwealth of Pennsylvania, it encompasses approximately five square miles (1300 hectares). 

According to 2000 local census data, it serves a resident population of 25,297.

History
Established during the early to mid-1800s, the Lebanon School District began its school year at roughly the beginning of October, during the 1850s. The treasurer of the school district in 1852 was Henry Dehuff, Officers of the school board in 1854 included Jacob Umberger, president, and Andrew Light, secretary. 

In May 1853, the Pennsylvania General Assembly passed legislation authorizing "the School Directors of the Borough of Lebanon, to borrow money; and to occupy the building used by the Female Seminary in the said Borough for Common School purposes." This legislation also empowered members of the district's school board "to borrow any sum of money not exceeding the sum of Five Thousand Dollars, at a rate of interest not exceeding six percent, per annum, for the purpose of building, enlarging and repairing the School Houses in said district."

Schools

Primary schools
Harding Elementary
Henry Houck Elementary
Northwest Elementary
Southwest Elementary
Southeast Elementary

Intermediate school
Lebanon Middle School
Willow Street Academy - closed June 2012;  former temporary school for 9th grade students during renovations at Lebanon High School

Secondary school
Lebanon High School

References

External links
 Lebanon School District Website

School districts in Lebanon County, Pennsylvania